Tracy Wiles (born c. 1970) is an English actress, who has worked on radio, stage and TV, and in film. She has appeared in McCallum (1997), Sea of Souls (2004), Doctors (2005-2023), The Line of Beauty (2006), Britz (2007), Holby City (2007–2017), Ashes to Ashes (2008), EastEnders (2011), Le Donne (2015), Manhunt, Shetland and Top Boy (all 2019), and The Catch in 2023.

Biography 
Wiles was born in Lincolnshire but raised on the Island of Islay.  She graduated from the Royal Conservatoire of Scotland in 1995. Film appearances include Samaria Intrigo, Wild Rose, Bronson, Swinging with the Finkels and the short film Awakening, which won Best Drama at the New York Short Film Festival 2015. 

Her television work includes Shetland, Top Boy, Manhunt, Outnumbered, Law & Order, Siblings, EastEnders, Holby City, Ashes to Ashes and Britz. She has won the Carleton Hobbs BBC Radio Drama Award, the James Bridie Gold Medal, and the Hyacinth Havergal Prize. She works extensively in radio, acting in over 300 plays and comedies to date. In 1998, she started a company called Tryarz, which focused on new plays. In 2019, she appeared in an episode of the BBC soap opera Doctors as Judge Siobhan Higgins.

In 2023, Wiles appeared in two episodes of the Channel 5 series The Catch.

Filmography

Film

Television

Video games

Radio

Stage

References

External links

Living people
British radio actresses
1970 births